Krasnokamenka may refer to:

Krasnokamenka, Chelyabinsk Oblast, a village in Chelyabinsk Oblast, Russia
Krasnokamenka (urban-type settlement), an urban-type settlement in Yalta, Crimea, Ukraine/Russia
Krasnokamenka (village), a village in Feodosia, Crimea, Ukraine/Russia